This Is Where the Fight Begins is the first full length album by British band The Ghost of a Thousand. The album was released on February 19, 2007, on Undergroove Records. It was given 5K's (out of 5) in the rock magazine Kerrang!. The album was re-released as a 12" record under Holy Roar Records with new art and a bonus CD with nine unheard recordings on September 7, 2009.

Track listing

Bonus CD:
 Bored of Math (Live Demo)
 Left for Dead (Live Demo)
 Up to You (Live Demo)
 New Toy (Home Recording)
 Black Art Number One (Home Recording)
 As They Breed They Swarm (First Official Band Recording)
 Tiny Ships In Giant Oceans (Unreleased B-Side)
 No-One Ever Gives You a Straight Answer to Anything (Instrumental Demo)
 The Last Bastion of Heaven Lies Abandoned and Burning (Home Recording)

Personnel
 Tom Lacey - vocals, lyrics, layout and text
 Andy Blyth - guitar
 Jag Jago - guitar
 Memby Jago - drums, percussion
 Gaz Spencer - bass guitar
 Jason Wilson and Sam Burden at Stakeout Studios - Production and engineering.  The original CD sleeve was misprinted.
 Guy Davies - additional engineering
 Kurt Ballou - mixing
 Nick Zampiello - mastering
 James Hines - artwork
 Yuki Snow - Japanese band logo

Awards
No. 6 Best Album of 2007 Critics' Choice, Kerrang! magazine
Top 5 Metal Albums, Q magazine
No. 11 Rocksound magazine Album of the Year 2007

External links 
Official MySpace profile
Official record label profile
Digital Lard's review
Studio Where The Album Was Recorded

2007 albums
The Ghost of a Thousand albums
Undergroove Records albums